William Cocke (1748August 22, 1828) was an American lawyer, pioneer, and statesman. He has the distinction of having served in the state legislatures of four different states: Virginia, North Carolina, Tennessee, and Mississippi, and was one of the first two United States senators for Tennessee.

Early life and education
Cocke was born in Amelia County, Virginia in 1748.  He was of English descent. He was the sixth of ten or eleven children of Abraham (c.1695–1760) and Mary (Batte) Cocke. He was educated at home before reading law, and was admitted to the bar in Virginia. He owned slaves.

Political Offices
Cocke was an elected member of the Virginia House of Burgesses.  In 1776, as a colonel of militia, he led a company of men into North Carolina's Washington District for action against the Indians. Cocke suffered accusations of cowardice following his actions at the Battle of Island Flats that followed him throughout his life. Later that year, he left Virginia and moved to what was to become Tennessee.  During the organization of the State of Franklin, Cocke was elected as the would-be state's delegate to the Congress of the Confederation.

In 1796, Cocke was chosen as a delegate to the convention that wrote the first Tennessee Constitution. The newly formed government selected Cocke to be one of the new state's initial senators, along with William Blount. Cocke and Blount presented their credentials to the United States Senate on May 9, 1796. The Senate, however, refused to seat Cocke and Blount while the debate regarding the admission of Tennessee into the Union was on. When Tennessee was finally admitted on June 1, the issue of Cocke and Blount's seating was again raised. The Federalist Senate held by a narrow margin (11–10) that Cocke and Blount's election was illegal because it had occurred without congressional authorization. The Tennessee legislature duly re-selected Cocke and Blount on August 2.

Cocke's initial term expired on March 3, 1797. The Tennessee General Assembly, however, neglected to elect a successor to Cocke; he was subsequently appointed to his former seat by Governor John Sevier on April 22, 1797, until the General Assembly belatedly elected his successor, Andrew Jackson. Later, he was elected by the Tennessee Assembly to the other U.S. Senate seat, and served from March 4, 1799 to March 3, 1805.

Cocke was appointed a judge of the First Circuit Court of Tennessee. On November 7, 1811 he was impeached by the Tennessee House of Representatives, and on October 10, 1812, at the end of his impeachment trial, he was convicted by the Tennessee Senate on one of the three articles of impeachment and thereby removed from office.

Personal life and family
Cocke engaged in a limited law practice, and spent more time on the frontier than he did in a law office. He was involved in exploration while in the company of Daniel Boone, traveling through much of what was to become eastern Kentucky and East Tennessee.

His son, John Alexander Cocke, was a four-term U.S. Representative from Tennessee; his grandson, William Michael Cocke, was a two-term U.S. Representative from Tennessee.

Later life and death
Cocke was appointed a judge of the First Judicial Circuit of Tennessee in 1809. He later resigned this position and moved to Mississippi. There, he was elected to the state legislature in 1813. He briefly returned to military duty, serving under Andrew Jackson in the Creek War. In 1814, he was appointed by President James Madison to be an Indian agent to the Chickasaw nation.

Cocke died in Columbus, Lowndes County, Mississippi, in 1828 and is buried there, in Friendship Cemetery.

Legacy
Cocke County, Tennessee is named in his honor.

Notes

External links

 
 

|-

|-

1748 births
1828 deaths
People from Amelia County, Virginia
Virginia colonial people
People from the State of Franklin
American people of English descent
Democratic-Republican Party United States senators from Tennessee
Members of the Mississippi House of Representatives
United States Indian agents
Virginia lawyers
American lawyers admitted to the practice of law by reading law
American slave owners
People of the Creek War
Burials in Mississippi
United States senators who owned slaves
Impeached United States judges removed from office by state or territorial governments